"Simple Man" is the last track on side one of Lynyrd Skynyrd's debut album, (Pronounced 'Lĕh-'nérd 'Skin-'nérd).

The song is one of Lynyrd Skynyrd's most popular songs.  Since the song became available for digital download, it has become Lynyrd Skynyrd's third best-selling digital song after "Sweet Home Alabama" and "Free Bird." It has sold 1,333,000 copies in the U.S. as of November 2013.

Musical structure 
"Simple Man" is written in the key of A minor/C major, though all guitars were tuned down a half step, effectively making it G# minor/B. The song begins with an electric arpeggiated chord sequence made up of the chords C major, G major and A minor (though with the tuned-down guitars, effective progression of B major, F# major and G# minor). This intro is accompanied by a bass line and cymbals before the drums and vocals come in for the verse. Lyrically the song is about a mother talking to her child about life, inspired by the passing of Ronnie Van Zant's grandmother. The chorus of the song includes electric guitars imitating sections of the arpeggiated intro progression. The guitar solo is performed by Gary Rossington.

Personnel

Lynyrd Skynyrd
 Ronnie Van Zant – lead vocals
 Gary Rossington – lead guitar and guitar solo
 Allen Collins – rhythm and lead guitars
 Ed King – bass guitar
 Bob Burns – drums and percussion
 Billy Powell – keyboards

Additional personnel
 Al Kooper – organ

Charts

References

External links
 

1973 songs
Lynyrd Skynyrd songs
Song recordings produced by Al Kooper
Hard rock ballads
1970s ballads
Songs written by Ronnie Van Zant
Songs written by Gary Rossington
Ty Cobb